Michael Daley Coulter  (born August 29, 1952) is a Scottish cinematographer. He achieved prominence for his collaborations with writer-director Bill Forsyth, and went on to work on high-profile films like Four Weddings and a Funeral (1994), Sense and Sensibility (1995), FairyTale: A True Story (1997), Notting Hill (1999), Mansfield Park (also 1999), Love Actually (2003), The Bank Job (2018), and The Hustle (2019). He was nominated for an Academy Award and a BAFTA Award for his work on Sense and Sensibility. He is a member of the British Society of Cinematographers, and BAFTA Scotland.

Early life 
Coulter was born in Glasgow in 1952. He was introduced to the local film business by his director brother-in-law, the Charles Gormley. He started as a gopher for local production companies making industrial films, before moving on to load the black and white film stock into camera magazines at football matches. He went freelance in 1975.

Career 
Coulter became acquainted with writer/director Bill Forsyth, shooting in his 1972 documentary short Islands of the West. He subsequently filmed Forsyth's first feature, That Sinking Feeling (1979). Coulter operated for Chris Menges on Forsyth's next pictures, Local Hero (1983) and Comfort and Joy (1984), which Coulter describes as "unmissable opportunities to work with a man I admired tremendously". 

During the early 1980s he also worked on many documentaries. "Documentaries made you resourceful, inventive. You had to make things work somehow. Also the life-experience of 'travel broadening the mind' was important for me". He enjoyed a brief stint in France during the early 1980s, as an assistant to cinematographer Pierre-William Glenn, but it was back in the UK that he passed a watershed. 

He was just about to start work as the camera operator on No Surrender (1985), when the original director of photography had to pull out. 

He has shot numerous commercials directed by Charles Sturridge, Tom Hooper, Mark Mylod, David Jellison (for Kleenex), Gerard de Thame (for Nissan,  Rolex, and KIA), among others.

Coulter is represented by McKinney Macartney Management in the UK and Gersh in the US.

Filmography

Film

As director of photography

As other

Television

Awards and nominations

References

External links

1952 births
Living people
British cinematographers
Film people from Glasgow
Scottish cinematographers